Robert Sour (1905 – 1985) was a lyricist and composer, and the president of Broadcast Music Incorporated (BMI). He was also one of the jurors in the murder trial of Eddie Lee Mays, who became the last man executed in New York.

In 1940 Sour worked for Broadcast Music as its lyrics editor, and by 1966 had risen through company ranks to become BMI's president. Two years later he had become the company's vice chairman and was instrumental in establishing BMI's musical theater workshop He retired in 1970.

Working with lyricists Edward Heyman and Frank Eyton and composer Johnny Green, Sour wrote the lyrics to the ballad "Body and Soul" from the 1930 revue, Three's A Crowd.  In partnership with Una Mae Carlisle (1915–1956), he also composed lyrics for the song "Walkin' by the River", which became a radio hit as sung by Syliva Froos (1927–2004) in 1941.  Ella Fitzgerald recorded "Walkin' by the River" for Decca Records, with Leroy Kirkland directing the orchestra.  Benny Carter also recorded "Walkin", with Carlisle on vocals.  Sour composed music and lyrics for both film and theater; along with Henry Katzman, he wrote the soundtrack sections "Twitterpated" and "Thumper's Song" for the Walt Disney Productions animated feature Bambi (1942).

Notes

External links

 New York Times

American male composers
American lyricists
1905 births
1985 deaths
20th-century American composers
20th-century American male musicians